Fitzgerald Public Schools is a school district based in Warren, Michigan.

Schools

Secondary schools
 Fitzgerald High School (9-12)
 Chatterton Middle School (6-9)

Primary schools
Mound Park Upper Elementary (4-5)
Westview Lower Elementary (1-3)
Schofield Early Childhood Center (PreK-Kindergarten)

References

External links

 Fitzgerald Public Schools

School districts in Michigan
Education in Macomb County, Michigan
Warren, Michigan